21st Century Killing Machine is the debut album by Swedish death-thrash metal band One Man Army and the Undead Quartet.

Reception
Metal.de gave 8/10 points.

Track listing
 "Killing Machine" – 6:42 (Johan Lindstrand)
 "Devil on the Red Carpet" – 5:04 (Lindstrand, Mikael Lagerblad)
 "Public Enemy No 1" – 4:12 (Lindstrand, Valle Adzic)
 "No Apparent Motive" – 3:54 (Lindstrand, Adzic) 
 "Hell Is for Heroes" – 5:00 (Lindstrand)
 "When Hatred Comes to Life" – 4:50 (Lindstrand, Adzic)
 "So Grim So True So Real" – 4:22 (Lindstrand, Adzic)
 "Behind the Church" – 4:09 (Lindstrand, Pekka Kiviaho)
 "Branded by Iron" – 6:51 (Lindstrand, Adzic)
 "Bulldozer Frenzy" – 2:49 (Lindstrand)
 "The Sweetness of Black (Bonus Track)" – 4:58 (Lindstrand)  
 "Mary’s Raising the Dead (Bonus Track)" – 6:49 (Lindstrand)

Personnel
Johan Lindstrand: Vocal
Mikael Lagerblad: Lead guitar
Pekka Kiviaho: Rhythm guitar
Valle Adzic: Bass
Marek Dobrowolski: Drums

Recorded & Engineered By One Man Army And The Undead Quartet & Dragan Tanaskovic
Vocals Recorded & Engineered By Valle Advic
Mastered By Dragan Tanaskovic

References

One Man Army and the Undead Quartet albums
2006 debut albums
Nuclear Blast albums